Karl Ola Tidman (born 11 May 1979) is a Swedish former professional footballer who played as a goalkeeper.

Club career
Tidman's past clubs have included BK Kick, Malmö FF, KAA Gent, RAA La Louvière, Stockport County, Sheffield Wednesday and FC Midtjylland. In early 2007 he spent a period on trial with Derry City, before impressing Pat Fenlon and being offered a two-year contract. In an inauspicious debut for City, Tidman conceded four goals as Derry City fell to a 4-1 home league defeat to Cork City on 9 April 2007.

In October 2008 he moved back to Denmark to play for Akademisk Boldklub of the Danish Viasat Sport Divisionen and signed on 15 April 2009 with IF Limhamn Bunkeflo.

International career
Tidman has represented Sweden at under-18 and under-21 levels.

References

External links
Player profile on 4TheGame.com

1979 births
Living people
Swedish footballers
Sweden under-21 international footballers
Malmö FF players
K.A.A. Gent players
R.A.A. Louviéroise players
Stockport County F.C. players
Sheffield Wednesday F.C. players
FC Midtjylland players
Derry City F.C. players
Kongsvinger IL Toppfotball players
Akademisk Boldklub players
IF Limhamn Bunkeflo (men) players
Allsvenskan players
Superettan players
Danish 1st Division players
Norwegian First Division players
League of Ireland players
Swedish expatriate footballers
Expatriate footballers in Belgium
Swedish expatriate sportspeople in Belgium
Expatriate footballers in England
Swedish expatriate sportspeople in England
Expatriate association footballers in Northern Ireland
Swedish expatriate sportspeople in Ireland
Expatriate footballers in Norway
Swedish expatriate sportspeople in Norway
Association football goalkeepers
Footballers from Malmö